Jordan Dorrell Hawkins (born April 29, 2002) is an American college basketball player for the UConn Huskies of the Big East Conference.

Early life and high school career
Hawkins grew up in Gaithersburg, Maryland and initially attended Gaithersburg High School. He transferred to DeMatha Catholic High School after his sophomore year. Hawkins was named the Maryland Gatorade Player of the Year as a senior after averaging 19.7 points, 11.4 rebounds, 3.7 assists, 2.3 steals, and 1.9 blocks per game. Hawkins was rated a four-star recruit and committed to playing college basketball for UConn over offers from Louisville, Marquette, Xavier, and Seton Hall.

College career
Hawkins played in 27 games as a freshman and averaged 5.8 points and two rebounds per game. He was named to the Big East Conference All-Freshman team at the end of the season. Hawkins suffered a concussion near the end of the season and missed the Huskies' Big East Tournament and NCAA Tournament games.

Hawkins entered his sophomore season as the Huskies' starting shooting guard. He suffered a second concussion during UConn's season opener. Hawkins missed two games and scored 20 points in his return against UNC-Wilmington.

Career statistics

College

|-
| style="text-align:left;"| 2021–22
| style="text-align:left;"| UConn
| 27 || 4 || 14.7 || .353 || .333 || .821 || 2.0 || .5 || .3 || .3 || 5.8

References

External links
UConn Huskies bio

2002 births
Living people
African-American basketball players
American men's basketball players
Basketball players from Maryland
UConn Huskies men's basketball players
Shooting guards